Mohamed Taieb Naciri (1939 – 29 May 2012) was a Moroccan lawyer and politician who held the position of Minister of Justice between 2010 and 2012 in the cabinet of Abbas El Fassi. Naciri worked as the attorney of the Moroccan royal family during much of his career.

He died of a heart attack on 29 May 2012 whilst attending an official meeting in Rabat.

See also
Cabinet of Morocco

References

Government ministers of Morocco
1939 births
People from Casablanca
20th-century Moroccan lawyers
2012 deaths
University of Hassan II Casablanca alumni